Moataz Eno (born October 9, 1983) was an Egyptian footballer.

Nickname
Moataz Eno adopted his nickname (Eno) from his father Eno who played for Al-Masry SC.

Zamalek
Moataz Eno is an Ahly youth product but moved to Zamalek when he was 13 on a youth contract. He made his first appearance for Zamalek aged 21. Eno, like his father, is known for Long-Range shots.

Al Ahly
In 2006, Eno's contract with Zamalek ran out and he moved as a free-agent to bitter rivals Al Ahly. In his first season, he sat on the bench for most of the season. The following season he scored against his former team Zamalek in the Egyptian Super Cup a match which ended 2–0 in the favour of Al Ahly. In the 2009/2010 season he began playing as a regular and made great performances but unfortunately he tore a cruciate ligament in the match against Petrojet.

International career

Eno has made one appearance for the Egypt national football team, a friendly against Uruguay on 16 August 2006. He was named to the Egypt squad for the 2006 African Cup of Nations, but did not appear in the tournament.

References

External links

Egyptian footballers
Al Ahly SC players
Zamalek SC players
Egypt international footballers
1983 births
Living people
Egyptian Premier League players
Association football defenders
Association football midfielders
UAE First Division League players
Tala'ea El Gaish SC players
Egyptian expatriate footballers
Egyptian expatriate sportspeople in the United Arab Emirates
Expatriate footballers in the United Arab Emirates
Ras Al Khaimah Club players
Haras El Hodoud SC players
Misr Lel Makkasa SC players